Quenzsee (Quenz Lake) is a lake in the state of Brandenburg, Germany. It is situated to the west of the city of Brandenburg an der Havel, and is one of a number of directly linked lakes, along with the Breitlingsee, Möserscher See, Plauer See and Wendsee.

The lake is navigable and has direct access to the Plauer See, and hence the River Havel, at its western end. The Silo Canal enters the lake at its eastern end. Navigation is administered as part of the Untere Havel–Wasserstraße.

During World War II, a converted mansion at the lake served as a sabotage school for spies who would participate in the failed Operation Pastorius.

References

External links

Lakes of Brandenburg
Federal waterways in Germany